Chathura de Alwis (born: 15 May) popularly known as Chathura Alwis, is a Sri Lankan journalist  He attended to the Sri Sumangala College, Panadura for his primary education and Thurstan College, Colombo for further studies. In 2017, he won the "Most Popular Journalist on Social Media" award at the Mashable World Social Media Day Awards. He was also awarded the SLIM-Nielsen Peoples' Award for Best Television Presenter in 2018, 2019, and 2020.

.

Awards 

|-
|| 2018 ||| Chathura Alwis ||SLIM-Nielsen Peoples Awards Best television presenter || 

|-
|| 2019 ||| Chathura Alwis ||SLIM-Nielsen Peoples Awards Best television presenter || 

|-
|| 2020 ||| Chathura Alwis ||SLIM-Nielsen Peoples Awards Best television presenter || 
|-
|| 2021 ||| Chathura Alwis ||SLIM-Nielsen Peoples Awards Peoples Television Presenter of the Year||

References 

Sri Lankan journalists
Sri Lankan television presenters
Year of birth missing (living people)
Living people